Anything Goes was an early Australian television variety series which aired on Melbourne station GTV-9. Broadcast on Wednesdays at 8:00 PM, it aired from 23 January to 20 February 1957.

It was hosted by Geoff Corke and Beverley Stewart, with episodes including audience participation, interviews and music with a guest vocalist.

Competition in the time-slot consisted of U.S. imports Ford Theatre (re-titled Kraft TV Theatre) and Douglas Fairbanks, Jr., Presents (re-titled Chesebrough-Ponds Playhouse) on HSV-7, while ABV-2 offered U.S. imports I Spy and Startime

The hour-long series was replaced by two local productions, game show The Dulux Show at 8:00 PM, with discussion series Leave It to the Girls at 8:30 PM (for two weeks this slot was held by U.S. anthology series episodes).

References

External links

Nine Network original programming
1957 Australian television series debuts
1957 Australian television series endings
Australian variety television shows
Black-and-white Australian television shows
English-language television shows
Australian live television series